The 3rd Regional Community Defense Group, Army Reserve Command is a line unit of the Army Reserve Command of the Philippine Army. It was created for the sole purpose of Reserve Force management, procurement, and organisation in the areas encompassing Central Luzon.

Community Defense Centers (CDC) under 3RCDG.

• 301st (NEC) CDC – Camp Gen Tinio, Bangad, Cabanatuan City

• 302nd (TLC) CDC – Camp Gen Aquino, San Miguel, Tarlac City

• 303rd (PAM) CDC – Belen Homesite, Angeles City, Pampanga

• 304th (BUL) CDC – Brgy Lico, San Rafael, Bulacan

• 305th (BAT) CDC – Brgy Camacho, Balanga, Bataan City

• 306th (ZAM) CDC – Zone II, Zambales Sports Center, Iba, Zambales

• 307th (AUR) CDC – ATC Compound, Baler, Aurora

References

Military units and formations of the Philippine Army
Reserve and Auxiliary Units of the Philippine Military